Waterford Valley is a neighbourhood in the west end of St. John's, Newfoundland and Labrador.

The Waterford Valley is an affluent area which encompasses the areas from Topsail Road in the north to the Southside Hills at the south, stretching west from the end of Water Street to the city's border with Mount Pearl. This area is home to the Waterford Bridge Road area.

The Waterford psychiatric hospital is in Waterford valley.

Notable features of the Waterford Valley
 Bowring Park

See also
 Neighbourhoods in St. John's, Newfoundland and Labrador

References

Neighbourhoods in St. John's, Newfoundland and Labrador